Carnaúba dos Dantas is a municipality in the state of Rio Grande do Norte in the Northeast region of Brazil.

Ermo Village
Ermo village is located in countryside of Carnaúba dos Dantas, where 350 inhabitants live.
	It is 10 kilometers away from Carnaúba dos Dantas and it is divided into Ermo, Upper Ermo and Ermo Below.
	It offers educational services through the Francisco Macedo Dantas school, which offers early childhood education up to the 9th grade for students in the community and surrounding areas.
	Medical, dental and nursing care takes place at the community health center, weekly.
	
	Bom Jesus brick yard and Bom Jesus biscuit factory generate most of the jobs for local people. Some families get income through agriculture and handicrafts.
	There are two markets, Santana and JS, which offer the purchase of food and cleaning products.
	The busiest leisure area in Ermo is the resort Portal do Rio, but we also have a sports court that is open every day with futsal and volleyball training.
	
	As much as the village is a small place, it is quite welcoming.

See also
List of municipalities in Rio Grande do Norte

References

Municipalities in Rio Grande do Norte